Throughout the COVID-19 pandemic, the national and local governments of the Philippines have coordinated numerous international and domestic evacuations.

Repatriations

Background
As early as February 2020, the Philippine government has taken measures to evacuate its citizens during the COVID-19 pandemic. This includes the repatriation of overseas Filipinos from various countries and international conveyances affected by the pandemic and domestic evacuation of locally stranded individuals, which were conducted by the national and local governments.

The Philippine government has repatriated its citizens from various COVID-19 affected countries and international conveyances. By August 24, 2021, more than 1.38 million overseas Filipinos have been evacuated since its first repatriation in the first quarter of 2020. According to the DFA, COVID-19 pandemic–related repatriations have become the largest evacuation effort conducted by the country since the 1991 Gulf War in the Middle East, where approximately 20,000 to 30,000 individuals had been evacuated.

Initial evacuations
The first of such efforts by the government involved repatriating Filipino nationals in Hubei, China. The government began the repatriation process on January 18, 2020. Upon arrival in the Philippines, individuals underwent mandatory quarantine for 14 days. The Athlete's Village at the New Clark City Sports Hub which also has a clinic run by the Philippine General Hospital was chosen as the quarantine site for repatriated Filipinos and New Clark City was locked down on February 6, 2020, in preparation for the arrival of the repatriates.

Likewise, the Philippine government has repatriated Filipino seafarers, and to a lesser extent Filipino tourists, on board cruise ships in various countries and territories. The first of such effort was the repatriation of Filipino crew members and tourists on board the Diamond Princess in February 2020 which was quarantined off the coast of Yokohama due to confirmed COVID-19 infection. 445 Filipinos were quarantined in New Clark City. Filipino nationals on board cruise ships docked in seaports in other countries such as the United States and Italy were also repatriated.
 
After completing a 14-day quarantine period, repatriated seafarers will be given aid by the Overseas Workers Welfare Administration (OWWA). Each will receive  from the OWWA and  livelihood grant will be made available to Filipino seafarers who opted to stay permanently in the Philippines.

Domestic evacuations

The Hatid Tulong program (formerly Hatid Probinsya) was established by the COVID-19 National Task Force, the Department of Transportation and other government agencies to facilitate the transport of repatriated Overseas Filipino Workers back to their home localities. Another separate program of the national government is Balik Probinsya, which intends to encourage the migration of Metro Manila residents back to their home localities outside the metropolis for long-term settlement. Balik Probinsya program was suspended on June 11, 2020, to prioritize stranded individuals.

See also 
 Evacuations related to the COVID-19 pandemic
 Philippine government response to the COVID-19 pandemic
 Overseas Filipinos during the COVID-19 pandemic

References 

COVID-19 pandemic in the Philippines
Evacuations